John Frederick "Jim" Breton (July 15, 1891 – May 30, 1973) was a third baseman in Major League Baseball. He played for the Chicago White Sox.

References

External links

1891 births
1973 deaths
Illinois Fighting Illini baseball players
Major League Baseball third basemen
Chicago White Sox players
Davenport Prodigals players
Salt Lake City Bees players
Baseball players from Chicago